Russell Sherman (born March 25, 1930, in New York, New York) is an American classical pianist, educator and author.

Russell Sherman made his debut at The Town Hall in New York at age 15, later studying piano with Eduard Steuermann and composition with Erich Itor Kahn. Sherman has performed as a piano soloist with the New York Philharmonic, the Los Angeles Philharmonic, the Boston Symphony Orchestra, the Chicago Symphony Orchestra, and the Philadelphia Orchestra. He has performed in recital throughout the United States, Europe, South America, and the former Soviet Union.
 
He is currently artist-in-residence at New England Conservatory, where over thirty years ago he met and instructed Wha Kyung Byun, a woman who later became a well-known piano instructor herself as well as his wife.

Sherman's efforts as an educator have produced a number of pianists of note, among them, Marc-André Hamelin, Christopher O'Riley, Tian Ying, Keren Hanan, HaeSun Paik, Ning An, Hung-Kuan Chen, Minsoo Sohn, Christopher Taylor, Hugh Hinton, Soojin Ahn, Randall Hodgkinson, Heng-Jin Park, Zenan Yu, Rina Dokshitsky, Livan, Sergey Schepkin, Kathleen Supové, and Craig Smith.

Sherman's book of short essays on piano playing related concerns, "Piano Pieces," was published by Farrar, Straus and Giroux in 1996. Among the observations in "Piano Pieces" is Sherman's comment that, "Music dispels the fear of mortality and the need for rigid and permanent identities. Music rejects the nine-to-five schedule, the hunger for cash, the encroachments and limits of crass appetite."

References

External links
Russell Sherman's New England Conservatory faculty page
David Dubal interview with Russell Sherman, WNCN-FM, 11-Nov-1984

1930 births
Living people
American classical pianists
Male classical pianists
American male pianists
American music educators
New England Conservatory faculty
Jewish classical pianists
20th-century American pianists
21st-century classical pianists
20th-century American male musicians
21st-century American male musicians
21st-century American pianists